Established in 1993, Stellar Quines is a women's Scottish theatre company and charity based in Edinburgh, Scotland.

Stellar Quines was under the artistic direction of Muriel Romanes from 1996-2016 when Jemima Levick took over.

The company has worked predominantly with Scotland but has also toured shows nationally and internationally.

Origin of the Name
The name Stellar Quines is a combination of two old Scots words: Stellar meaning starry, and Quines meaning women.  It was suggested by Gerda Stevenson, who established the company in 1993 to "address the lack of opportunities for women in theatre."

Productions
 Dare to Care by Christine Lindsay, directed by Muriel Romanes, March 2014 touring Scotland 
 The List written by Jennifer Tremblay, translated by Shelley Tepperman, directed by Muriel Romanes and starring Maureen Beattie. For the Edinburgh Fringe 2012. It is being re-staged for the Fringe 2013.
 Ana written by Claire Duffy & Pierre Yves Lemieux & directed by Serge Denoncourt - from October 2011, world premiere at Espace Go, Montreal and then touring Canada and the UK. A co-production between Stellar Quines and Imago Théâtre
 Age of Arousal written by Linda Griffiths (inspired by The Odd Women by George Gissing) & directed by Muriel Romanes - February–April 2011, opened in Royal Lyceum Theatre, Edinburgh and then toured. A co-production between Stellar Quines and the Royal Lyceum Theatre, Edinburgh
 The Girls of Slender Means by Muriel Spark, adapted for the stage by Judith Adams & directed by Muriel Romanes - Assembly Rooms (Edinburgh), August 2009
 Baby Baby written by Vivien French & directed by Jemima Levick - January–March 2009, opened in Garrison Theatre, Lerwick, Shetland and then toured
 The Unconquered written by Torben Betts & directed by Muriel Romanes, February - March 2007, Toured to UK & then New York, USA in 2008. The play won the Best New Play award at the Critics' Awards for Theatre in Scotland, 2007.
 Perfect Pie written by Judith Thompson & directed by Maureen Beattie - March–April 2006, Touring Scotland. Produced by Stellar Quines in Association with The Byre Theatre of St Andrews and Perth Theatre
 Three Thousand Troubled Threads written by Chiew Siah Tei & directed by Muriel Romanes - August–September 2005. A co-production between Stellar Quines Theatre Company, Edinburgh International Festival and the Byre Theatre, St Andrews
 The Memory of Water written by Shelagh Stephenson & directed by Muriel Romanes - April–June 2004, Touring
 Sweet Fanny Adams in Eden written by Judith Adams & directed by Muriel Romanes - August 2003, Scottish Plant Collectors Garden, Pitlochry
 Wit written by Margaret Edson & directed by Gaynor MacFarlane - March–April 2003, touring
 The Reel of the Hanged Man written by Jeanne-Mance Delisle, translated by Martin Bowman and Bill Findlay & directed by Muriel Romanes - April 2000, opened in the Traverse Theatre and toured to Shetland, Glasgow, Stirling and Paisley
 Learning the Paso Doble written by Dilys Rose & directed by Irene Macdougall - Spring 1999, Touring
 The Clearing written by Helen Edmundson & directed by Muriel Romanes - 1998/1999, toured to Glasgow, Edinburgh, Dundee and Liverpool
 Refuge written by Janet Paisley & directed by Gerda Stevenson - March–April 1997, touring
 The Seal Wife written by Sue Glover & directed by Gerda Stevenson - 1995, touring
 Night Sky (play) written by Susan Yankowitz & directed by Lynn Bains - 1993, toured to Aberdeen, Ayr, Glasgow, St Andrews and Edinburgh

Other Activities

Rehearsal Room
Stellar Quines' Rehearsal Room was created to uncover new plays and new voices in partnership with the audience, through rehearsed readings and workshops. The main aim of Rehearsal Room is to enable writers to be more proactive in the development of their text using audience feedback as a major element of the process. It provides a platform for showcasing new plays and developing audiences, while also existing as a showcase for potential co-producers and promoters.

Many of the productions that Stellar Quines have created have been through the Rehearsal Room process before becoming full-scale productions.

Commissions
Stellar Quines regularly commissions new work. Since its inception the company has commissioned the writing, adaptation or translation of following plays:
 Translation of Deliverance - written by Jennifer Tremblay, translated by Shelley Tepperman
 Dare to Care - written by Christine Lindsay
 Translation of A Live Bird in the Mouth - written by Jeanne-Mance Delisle, translated by Martin Bowman
 Ana – written by Clare Duffy and Pierre Yves Lemieux 
 Constantina – written by Torben Betts
 An adaptation of The Girls of Slender Means by Muriel Spark for the stage adapted by Judith Adams
 The Girl Who Insisted She Wasn't – written by Ariadne Cass
 The Past Is Not a Place – written by Beatrice Colin
 The Unconquered – written by Torben Betts
 Sweet Fanny Adams in Eden – written by Judith Adams
 Red Priest – written by Grace Barnes
 Translation of The Reel of the Hanged Man written by Jeanne-Mance Delisle, translated by Martin Bowman and Bill Findlay
 Learning The Paso Doble – written by Dilys Rose
 Refuge – written by Janet Paisley

Awards
2013
 The List - won Best Production in the Critics' Awards for Theatre in Scotland

2012
 The List - won Fringe First
 The List - won Herald Angel

2011
 Age of Arousal - won Best Director, Muriel Romanes in the Critics' Awards for Theatre in Scotland
 Age of Arousal - nominated for Best Show, Best Ensemble and Best Design in the Critics' Awards for Theatre Scotland

2007
 The Unconquered - Torben Betts won Best New Play at the Critics' Awards for Theatre in Scotland 2007

2003
 Alexandra Mathie won Best Female Performance as Dr Vivian Bearing in Wit at the 2002-3 Critics' Awards for Theatre in Scotland

1996
 Refuge - won the Peggy Ramsay Award for the development of new writing

Projects
Knit 2 Together

Knit 2 Together is a Heritage lottery funded All Our Stories project aimed as championing the female stories and histories intertwined in the Scottish Borders' textiles industries, and combines events, new writing and oral history. Knit 2 Together involves a series of knitting circles/local history sessions hosted by Stellar Quines in partnership with Heart of Hawick.

Playwright Sylvia Dow will use the project as the inspiration for a new play which celebrates women, knitting and Scotland's social history. The play will be given a rehearsed reading in Hawick in October 2013, as part of the Luminate festival.
All Our Stories, a brand new small grant programme, was launched in support of BBC Two's The Great British Story and was designed as an opportunity for everyone to get involved in their heritage.

Research
Digital Development

Stellar Quines conducts research into the ways digital technology may be used to enhance the work of the company, with the three main areas of research development being artistic, audience and business. Artistic development focuses on the ways in which digital technology may be used to enhance the creation of live theatre; audience development explores how company can extend its reach and engagement with new and current audiences; business development exploring new business models, with the aim of extending the life of live performances and delivering work in new ways.

To date this work has involved a number of projects and experiments, including live streaming and 3D theatre.

Gender in Scottish Theatre

In 2010, Stellar Quines undertook a research project, funded by the Scottish Arts Council Equalities Department, to provide the basis for Stellar Quines to test its purpose as a company, and refocus its vision for the future.

Phase One of the project was a piece of desk-based research, reviewing secondary data related to gender in the performing arts, to build an opinion based picture of women in theatre. The output of a series of Scottish building-based and touring companies in 1993 (the year Stellar Quines was founded) and 2009 (the last full Scottish theatre season before the research was commissioned) was assessed. The study of two Scottish theatre seasons 18 years apart explored to what extent women were represented as directors, writers, actors, lighting, set and costume designers, and composers/musical directors.

Phase Two involved consultations with, and a survey of, a wide range of individuals from the Scottish theatre world. Individuals, groups and organisations who had a relationship with the company, or were relevant to the company's work, were surveyed - as well as those who had no existing relationship with the company but showed an interest in the future development of women in Scottish theatre.
Stellar Quines then reviewed the results from both phases of research, before adding its own observations.

The Company
Artistic Director
 Muriel Romanes (1996-2016)
 Jemima Levick (2016-)

Company Administrator
 Gillian Shaw

References

External links
Official website

Theatre companies in Scotland